Sarasota County is a county located in southwestern Florida. At the 2020 US census, the population was 434,006. Its county seat is Sarasota and its largest city is North Port. Sarasota County is part of the North Port–Sarasota–Bradenton, FL metropolitan statistical area.

History

The area that is now known as Sarasota County has been inhabited by humans for some 10,000 years. Evidence of human remains as well as a burned out log at the Warm Mineral Springs, in North Port, were discovered that date to the early Archaic period.

Although the name was associated with the area from the beginning of European contacts, the origin of the name "Sarasota" is unknown. In the early twentieth-century, a fanciful story was created to go hand-in-hand with a pageant held in Sarasota. The story held that the town was named after the daughter of famous explorer Hernando de Soto's daughter Sara.

An early map of the area from 1763 shows the word "Zarazote" across present day Sarasota.

Following exploration, the area was occupied by fishing camps, called ranchos. In 1842, the Armed Occupation Act was passed, which deeded land to settlers who were willing to cultivate land in Florida. The act brought settlers to Sarasota but also led to the Second Seminole War. During the war, the area was occupied by the U.S. army and Fort Armistead was built.

Sarasota County was created in 1921 from the southern part of Manatee County. After acquisition by the United States as a territory, the area now included in Sarasota county had been part of St. Johns County (1821), Alachua County (1824), Hillsborough County (1834), and Manatee County (1855) as new counties were created from older counties to accommodate population growth and settlement in new areas.

Geography

Adjacent counties
 Manatee County – north
 DeSoto County – east
 Charlotte County – south

Parks and preserves
In addition to local parks there are several preserve areas including:

 Bayonne Parcel
 Circus Hammock
 Curry Creek Preserve
 Deer Prairie Creek
 Jelks Preserve
 Lemon Bay Preserve
 Legacy Trail
 Manasota Scrub Preserve
 Myakkahatchee Creek Environmental Park
 Myakka Islands Point
 Old Miakka Preserve
 Pinelands Reserve
 Pocono Trail Preserve
 Red Bug Slough
 Sleeping Turtles South
 Sleeping Turtles North
 South Lemon Bay Preserve
 T. Mabry Carlton Reserve

Government and politics
Sarasota County is one of only 20 Florida counties with its own charter, adopted in 1971.  Sarasota County is governed by a five-member county commission. Each commissioner serves a four-year term and resides in and represents a single district.

Like most of Southwest Florida, Sarasota County is considered a stronghold for the Republican Party and was one of the first parts of Florida to turn Republican. The last Democratic presidential candidate to win it was Franklin D. Roosevelt in 1944, although Barack Obama lost it by just 211 votes in 2008. Republicans have historically dominated the county commission and other countywide elected positions. However, the city of Sarasota has an all-Democrat city commission, Democrat Michele Rayner represents a portion of the county in the Florida House of Representatives, and there are two countywide elected Democrats.

Public safety

Fire/EMS
The Sarasota County Fire Department (SCFD) provides fire services to the City of Sarasota and all unincorporated areas of the county with the exception of areas covered by the Nokomis and Englewood fire districts. Additionally, SCFD provides EMS service to the City of Sarasota, all unincorporated areas of the county (including areas covered by the Nokomis and Englewood fire districts) plus the city of Venice.

Law enforcement
The Sarasota County Sheriff's Office (SSO) is the county's primary law enforcement agency. It is responsible for patrolling the unincorporated areas of the county along with operating the county's jail and providing courtroom security. SSO also operates the county's primary 911 center. The cities of Sarasota, North Port, and Venice along with the Town of Longboat Key each have their own police departments. The Florida Highway Patrol is responsible for patrolling FDOT maintained roads in the county (Florida State Highway System) and investigating motor vehicle accidents that occur in unincorporated areas.

Three specialist law enforcement agencies have jurisdiction in the county: the Sarasota-Bradenton International Airport Police Department, the New College/USF Sarasota-Manatee Campus Police Department and the Seminole Gulf Railway (SGLR) Police Department. Each agency has jurisdiction in neighboring Manatee County as well; each agency's properties extend into that county.

Voter registration

Party statistics

Government officials

United States Senate

United States House of Representatives

Florida State Senate

Florida House of Representatives

Sarasota County Commission
The Board of County Commissioners include the following:

Sarasota County School Board
The School Board members include the following:<

Transportation

Airports
 Sarasota-Bradenton International Airport, in both Manatee County (runway) and Sarasota County (terminal).
 Venice Municipal Airport, a general aviation airport in Venice.
 Hidden River Airport, a private airport in the eastern part of the county.
 Buchan Airport, in Englewood.

Major highways and state roads
  Interstate 75 – North–south limited-access freeway, and has ten interchanges within Sarasota County. Major north–south highway in Sarasota County. It is the high-speed connection with other cities such as Tampa, Florida and Fort Myers, Florida. Interstate 75 heads east in Southern Sarasota County through North Port, Florida to cross Charlotte Harbor at a more manageable length.
  U.S. Highway 41 – The main north–south road through the county is known as Tamiami Trail. It was created in the 1920s to connect Tampa with Miami, hence the contracted name. It runs through the county close to the coastline and is not limited-access.
  U.S. Highway 301 – This highway begins in the city of Sarasota, east of Tamiami Trail, and runs north–south through the county.
  State Road 789 – Gulf of Mexico Drive
  State Road 758 – Midnight Pass Road, Higel Avenue, Siesta Drive, South Osprey Avenue, Bee Ridge Road
  State Road 780 – Fruitville Road
  State Road 776 – Englewood Road and North Indiana Avenue
  State Road 72 – Stickney Point Road and Clark Road
  State Road 681 – Venice Connector, this road was formerly the southern terminus of Interstate 75 in the early 1980s

Public transportation
 Sarasota County Area Transit (SCAT) provides public transportation for Sarasota County, Florida. SCAT is operated by Sarasota County. It maintains 19 fixed-line bus routes plus a dial-a-ride paratransit service (SCAT Plus).

Demographics

As of the 2020 United States census, there were 434,006 people, 189,228 households, and 117,532 families residing in the county. 3.5% of that population was under the age of 5 years old, 14.0% was under 18 years old, and 37.4% was 65 years or older. 52.4% was female.

The median household income was $64,644 with a per capita income of $44,402. 8.7% of population below the poverty threshold. The median value of owner-occupied housing-units between 2016-2020 was $269,300 and the median gross rent was $1,342.

There were 41,215 veterans living in the county. 12.2% of the population were Foreign born persons. 93.2% of the population that was 25 years or older were High school graduates and 36.4% of those 25 years or older had a Bachelor's degree or higher.

Religions
, the religious affiliations of the people of Sarasota County, according to Pew Research Center were:

Economy

Top private employers
, the top private employers for Sarasota County are as follows:

 Sarasota Memorial Health Care System (4,563)
 PGT Innovations (2,000)
 Publix (1,733)
 Venice Regional Medical Center (812)
 Sun Hydraulics (632)
 Tervis Tumbler (570)
 Shared Services Center Sarasota (455)
 FCCI Insurance (426)
 Doctors Hospital (415)
 Jackson Hewitt, Inc. (337)

Top public and private employers
, the top employees for Sarasota County, including public sector jobs, are as follows:

 School Board of Sarasota County (4,563)
 Sarasota Memorial Hospital (4,244) 
 Sarasota County Government (3,533)
 Publix Supermarkets (2,793)
 PGT Industries (2,079)

Sports and recreation
Sarasota County is home to Ed Smith Stadium, where the Baltimore Orioles currently have spring training. The Orioles also have minor league facilities at Twin Lakes Park. In January 2017, the Braves announced a formal agreement to move their Spring Training home to North Port. CoolToday Park opened on March 24, 2019.

Sarasota County is also home to Nathan Benderson Park. The facility has played host to the 2017 World Rowing Championships and subsequent World Rowing events in 2018 and 2019. It has also been the host of the 2016 Olympic Time Trials - Rowing and will host the delayed 2020 Olympic rowing time trials. NBP has also been the site of multiple NCAA national rowing championship regattas, the USRowing Youth National Championships, and other rowing regattas and dragon boat festivals since 2011. The park will host the 2021 U.S. Dragon Boat Federation National Championships and the 2022 International Dragon Boat Federation Club Crew World Championships, after holding the 2014 International Breast Cancer Paddlers Commission world regatta.

Nathan Benderson Park is also the site of Olympic qualifying events in triathlon and paratriathlon, with several ITU Triathlon World Cup and Americas Triathlon Cup events over the years. Numerous community running and walking events, music and food festivals and other community events are held in the park, including the annual NBP Fireworks On The Lake, held every July 3, and NBP Trick Or Treat On The Lake, held the last week of October.

Education

Primary and secondary education
 Sarasota County Public Schools – public K–12 School district serving all of Sarasota County

Higher education
 New College of Florida – public liberal arts college. Honors college of the state of Florida
 Ringling College of Art and Design – private, 4-year, not-for-profit, fully accredited college with concentrations in art and design
 State College of Florida, Manatee–Sarasota – South Venice Campus of SCF
 University of South Florida Sarasota-Manatee – branch campus of USF

Museums and libraries

Library branches:
 Betty J. Johnson North Sarasota Public Library
 Elsie Quirk Public Library
 Frances T. Bourne Jacaranda Public Library
 Fruitville Public Library
 Gulf Gate Public Library
 North Port Public Library
 The Osprey Public Library at the Historic Spanish Point
 Selby Public Library
 Shannon Staub Library
 William H. Jervey, Jr. Venice Public Library

Sarasota County residents may obtain library cards for free and valid library cards may be used to check out materials at all ten Sarasota County libraries. Manatee and Charlotte County residents, as well as library users from any of the Tampa Bay Library Consortium libraries may register as reciprocal borrowers and check out materials in Sarasota County. Non-resident cards are available for purchase and offer the same privileges as resident cards.

The library system provides a variety of services which include adult, teen and children's materials. Computers for public use are available at all nine Sarasota County Libraries and free wireless access in the libraries is provided by the Sarasota County Government.  The library system has licensing to the Cloud Library, OverDrive, Inc. and Freegal Music. Ask a Librarian, the on-line Florida librarian reference system is available through the Sarasota County Public Library System.
Sarasota County residents have access to the Pinellas Talking Book Library as well as a Books-by-Mail service. The Selby Public Library has been a selective depository in the Federal Depository Library Program and receives almost 50% of the government publications distributed through the program. Additionally, the Sarasota County Library System is an organization member of the Florida Library Association.

The Little Free Library program was introduced to Sarasota County in 2014 as the result of a collaborative effort between the Libraries and Historical Resources department, the Parks, Recreation and Natural Resources department and the UF/IFAS Sarasota County Extension and Sustainability department. The Sarasota County Little Free Libraries have been placed at thirteen different county parks and recreation centers.

History
The first library, which was established in 1907 by the Sarasota Town Improvement Society. County libraries have been established in response to community demands and needs.

The first libraries were autonomous with the Head Librarians reporting directly to the County Administrator. Sarasota Public Library was managed by Betty Service, the Englewood library by Harriet Ives, and Venice by Jean McGuire. Joan Hopkins directed and coordinated library services for the rapidly growing population. She directed the establishment of Gulf Gate Public Library, North Port Public Library, Frances T. Bourne Jacaranda Public Library and the new downtown Sarasota library, and laid the groundwork for building future libraries in the county.

Local media

Newspapers
 North Port Sun – an edition of the Charlotte Sun newspapers
 Sarasota Herald Tribune – primarily serves Sarasota County for news, but also serves Manatee, Charlotte and DeSoto counties. Circulation is 110,817 daily and 132,185 on Sunday (2005 averages) Also operates an online news portal, HeraldTribune.com
 Scene Magazine, a civic, business and social publication serving Sarasota and Manatee counties.
 Observer Media Group newspapers: East County Observer, Longboat Observer, Sarasota Observer, Siesta Key Observer
 The Sarasota News Leader – online weekly news
 Venice Gondolier Sun

Television
Sarasota County is part of the Tampa/St. Petersburg/Sarasota DMA, however the following stations have facilities located in the county:
 WWSB – a local ABC affiliate based in Sarasota, which serves as the primary ABC affiliate for Sarasota County and a Secondary ABC affiliate for the rest of the Tampa/St. Petersburg/Sarasota DMA
 WSNN-LD – local twenty-four-hour news station based in Sarasota
 Various government and local access channels. Access 19 (Local Government channel), Education Channel (School Board) and BLAB TV (local programming)

Television stations serving all or part of Sarasota County but located in Saint Petersburg or Tampa include: 
WTVT - the local Fox affiliate based in Tampa
WFLA - the local NBC affiliate based in Tampa
WTSP - the local CBS affiliate based in St. Petersburg
WFTS - the primary ABC affiliate for the Tampa/St. Petersburg/Sarasota DMA, based in St. Petersburg

Radio
 WCTQ – (92.1 and 103.1 Country)
 WSLR-LP – (96.5 Community Radio)
 WSDV - (103.9 Top-40)

Communities

Cities
 North Port
 Sarasota
 Venice

Town
 Longboat Key

Census-designated places

 Bee Ridge
 Desoto Lakes
 Englewood
 Fruitville
 Gulf Gate Estates
 Kensington Park
 Lake Sarasota
 Lakewood Ranch (part)
 Laurel
 Nokomis
 North Sarasota
 Osprey
 Palmer Ranch
 Plantation
 Ridge Wood Heights
 Sarasota Springs
 Siesta Key
 South Gate Ridge
 South Sarasota
 South Venice
 Southgate
 The Meadows
 Vamo
 Venice Gardens
 Warm Mineral Springs

Other unincorporated communities
 Wellen Park (part)

See also
 National Register of Historic Places listings in Sarasota County, Florida
 Sarasota National Cemetery

Notes

References

 
Charter counties in Florida
Florida placenames of Native American origin
1921 establishments in Florida
Populated places established in 1921
Counties in the Tampa Bay area